Hannah More (2 February 1745 – 7 September 1833) was an English religious writer, philanthropist, poet and playwright in the circle of Johnson, Reynolds and Garrick, who wrote on moral and religious subjects. Born in Bristol, she taught at a school her father founded there and began writing plays. She became involved in the London literary elite and a leading Bluestocking member. Her later plays and poetry became more evangelical. She joined a group opposing the slave trade. In the 1790s she wrote Cheap Repository Tracts on moral, religious and political topics, to distribute to the literate poor (as a retort to Thomas Paine's Rights of Man). Meanwhile, she broadened her links with schools she and her sister Martha had founded in rural Somerset. These curbed their teaching of the poor, allowing limited reading but no writing. More was noted for her political conservatism, being described as an anti-feminist, a "counter-revolutionary", or a conservative feminist.

Early life
Born in 1745 at Fishponds in the parish of Stapleton, near Bristol, Hannah More was the fourth of five daughters of Jacob More (1700–1783), a schoolmaster from a strong Presbyterian family in Harleston, Norfolk, who had joined the Church of England. He sought to pursue a clerical career, but after losing a lawsuit over an estate he had hoped to inherit he moved to Bristol, where he became an excise officer and later taught at the Fishponds free school.

The sisters were first educated by their father, learning Latin and mathematics. Hannah was also taught by elder sisters, through whom she learned French, which she improved conversationally by spending time with French prisoners of war in Frenchay during the Seven Years' War. She was an assiduous, discerning student. Family tradition has it that she began writing at an early age.

In 1758 Jacob established a girls' boarding school at Trinity Street, Bristol, for the elder sisters, Mary and Elizabeth, to run, while he and his wife moved to Stony Hill in the city to open a school for boys. Hannah More became a pupil in the girls' school when she was twelve and taught there in early adulthood.

In 1767 More gave up her share in the school on becoming engaged to William Turner of the Belmont Estate, Wraxall, Somerset, whom she had met when he began teaching her cousins. After six years the wedding had not taken place. Turner seemed reluctant to name a date and in 1773 the engagement was broken off. It seems this led More into a nervous breakdown, from which she recuperated in Uphill, near Weston-super-Mare. She was induced to accept a £200 annuity from Turner as compensation. This freed her for literary pursuits. In the winter of 1773–1774 she went to London with her sisters, Sarah and Martha – the first of many such trips at yearly intervals. Some verses she had written on David Garrick's version of King Lear led to an acquaintance with him.

She later moved to Bath where she stayed between 1792–1802 on Great Pulteney Street.

Playwright
More's first literary efforts were pastoral plays written while she was still teaching and suitable for young ladies to act. The first was The Search after Happiness, written in 1762. By the mid-1780s over 10,000 copies of this had been sold. Among her literary models was Metastasio, on whose opera Attilio Regulo she based a drama, The Inflexible Captive.

In London, More sought to associate with the literary elite, including Samuel Johnson, Joshua Reynolds and Edmund Burke. Johnson is quoted as scolding her: "Madam, before you flatter a man so grossly to his face, you should consider whether or not your flattery is worth having." He would later be quoted as calling her "the finest versifatrix in the English language". Meanwhile, she became prominent in the Bluestocking group of women engaged in polite conversation and literary and intellectual pursuits. She attended the salon of Elizabeth Montagu, where she met Frances Boscawen, Elizabeth Carter, Elizabeth Vesey and Hester Chapone, some of whom would be lifelong friends. In 1782 she wrote a witty verse celebration of her friends and circle: The Bas Bleu, or, Conversation, published in 1784.

Garrick wrote a prologue and epilogue to Hannah More's tragedy Percy, which was successful at Covent Garden in December 1777 and revived in 1785 with Sarah Siddons at Theatre Royal, Drury Lane. A copy of Percy was found among Mozart's possessions in 1791. Another drama, The Fatal Falsehood, produced in 1779 after Garrick's death, was less successful and she stopped writing for the stage. However, a tragedy entitled The Inflexible Captive appeared in 1818. In 1781 she met Horace Walpole and corresponded with him. At Bristol she discovered the poet Ann Yearsley. When Yearsley became destitute, More raised a considerable sum of money for her benefit. Lactilla, as Yearsley was known, published Poems, on Several Occasions in 1785, earning about £600. More and Montagu held the profits in trust to protect them from Yearsley's husband. However, Ann Yearsley wished to receive the capital and made insinuations of stealing against More, forcing her to release it. These literary and social failures prompted More's withdrawal from London intellectual circles.

Evangelical moralist

In the 1780s Hannah More became a friend of James Oglethorpe, who had long been concerned with slavery as a moral issue and who was working with Granville Sharp as an early abolitionist. More published Sacred Dramas in 1782, which rapidly ran through 19 editions. These and the poems Bas-Bleu and Florio (1786) mark a gradual transition to graver views, expressed in prose in Thoughts on the Importance of the Manners of the Great to General Society (1788) and An Estimate of the Religion of the Fashionable World (1790). By this time she was close to William Wilberforce and Zachary Macaulay, sympathising with their evangelical views. Her poem Slavery appeared in 1788. For many years she was a friend of Beilby Porteus, Bishop of London and a leading abolitionist, who drew her into a group of anti-slave traders that included Wilberforce, Charles Middleton and also James Ramsay at Teston in Kent.

In 1785 More bought a house at Cowslip Green, near Wrington in northern Somerset, where she settled with her sister Martha and wrote several ethical books and tracts: Strictures on the Modern System of Female Education (1799), Hints towards Forming the Character of a Young Princess (1805), Coelebs in Search of a Wife (only nominally a story, 1809), Practical Piety (1811), Christian Morals (1813), Character of St Paul (1815) and Moral Sketches (1819). She was a rapid writer. Her work, though discursive and animated, was deficient in form. Her popularity may be explained by her originality and forceful subject-matter.

The outbreak of the French Revolution in 1789 did not worry More initially, but by 1790 she was writing, "I have conceived an utter aversion to liberty according to the present idea of it in France. What a cruel people they are!" She praised Edmund Burke's Reflections on the Revolution in France for combining "the rhetoric of ancient Gaul" and the "patriot spirit of ancient Rome" with "the deepest political sagacity". Part II of the Rights of Man, Thomas Paine's reply to Burke, appeared in 1792. The government was alarmed by its concern for the poor and call for world revolution, coupled with huge sales. Porteus visited More and asked her to write something for the lower orders to counteract Paine. This prompted a pamphlet, Village Politics (1792). More called it "as vulgar as [the] heart can wish; but it is only designed for the most vulgar class of readers." The pamphlet (published pseudonymously as by "Will Chip") consists of a dialogue in plain English between Jack Anvil, a village blacksmith, and Tom Hood, a village mason. After reading Paine, Tom Hood expresses admiration for the French Revolution to Jack Anvil and speaks in favour of a new constitution based on liberty and the "rights of man". Jack Anvil responds by praising the British constitution, saying Britain already has "the best laws in the world". He attacks French liberty as murder, French democracy as tyranny of the majority, French equality as a levelling down of social classes, French philosophy as atheism, and the "rights of man" as "battle, murder and sudden death". Tom Hood finally accepts Anvil's conclusion: "While old England is safe I'll glory in her, and pray for her; and when she is in danger I'll fight for her and die for her."

More's biographer summed up the pamphlet against Paine as "Burke for Beginners". It was well received: Porteus called it "a masterpiece of its kind, supremely excellent, greatly admired at Windsor". Frances Boscawen thought it exceeded William Paley's The British Public's Reasons for Contentment and Richard Owen Cambridge claimed "Swift could not have done it better." More's next anti-Jacobin tract, Remarks on the Speech of M. Dupont, condemned atheism in France. Its profits were passed to French Catholic priests exiled in England.

The two pamphlets attracted praise from the Association for the Discountenancing of Vice, an evangelical publishing society founded in Dublin in 1792. The membership wrote to her in June 1793 congratulating her on it and inviting her to become an honorary member. Accepting, More asked the Association to send her "two or three printed papers explaining the nature of the Association as perhaps I may use them to advantage with a friend or two, distinguished for their piety and active zeal."

Cheap Repository Tracts
In 1794, when Paine published The Age of Reason, a deist attack on Christianity, Porteus again requested More's help in combating Paine's ideas, but she declined, being preoccupied with her charity-school work. However, by the end of the year, More, encouraged by Porteus, decided to embark on a series of Cheap Repository Tracts, three of which appeared every month from 1795 to 1798. In January 1795, More explained to Zachary Macaulay: "Vulgar and indecent penny books were always common, but speculative infidelity brought down to the pockets and capacity of the poor forms a new era in our history. This requires strong counteraction." Her scheme developed from the ideas of the Association for discountenancing vice, though written in a more "readable and entertaining a style". The tracts sold 300,000 copies in March and April 1795, 700,000 by July 1795 and over two million by March 1796. They urged the poor in rhetoric of ingenious homeliness to rely on virtues of contentment, sobriety, humility, industry, reverence for the British Constitution, hatred of the French, and trust in God and the kindness of the gentry. Perhaps the most famous is The Shepherd of Salisbury Plain, describing a family of phenomenal frugality and contentment. This was translated into several languages. She also invited the Association for the Discountenancing of Vice to reprint her tracts in Ireland, which they did with success in more than 230 editions of 52 titles.

More was shocked by the strides made for female education in France: "They run to study philosophy, and neglect their families to be present at lectures in anatomy."

Views on schooling for poor and for girls
Intending "to escape from the world gradually", More moved in 1802 to Wrington in rural Somerset, where she had built a comfortable house and laid out a garden. She remained, however, active with several Somerset schools for the destitute that she and her sister Martha had founded from the 1780s, with Wilberforce's encouragement. She modelled the idealised hero and heroine in Coelebs in Search of Wife (1809) on the schools' prodigious benefactors: John and Louisa Harford of Blaise Castle.

The schools taught the Bible and the catechism on Sundays and in the week "such coarse works as may fit them for servants." For the poor, More declared, "I allow of no writing": they were not to be "made scholars and philosophers." There was local opposition: Church of England vicars suspected her of advancing Methodism and landowners saw even rudimentary literacy as a step above the children's proper station. At Wedmore, the Dean of Wells was petitioned to have More removed from the school.

To the Bishop of Bath and Wells she protested that her schools taught only "such coarse works as may fit them [their charges] for servants. I allow no writing for the poor. My object is... to train up the lower classes in habits of industry and piety."

More refused to read Mary Wollstonecraft's Vindication of the Rights of Women (1792). While many women may be "fond of government", they are not, she believed, "fit for it": "To be unstable and capricious is but too characteristic of our sex." More turned down honorary membership of the Royal Society of Literature, seeing her "sex alone a disqualification".

Those heeding Wollstonecraft's call to embrace the liberty without which women could "neither possess virtue or happiness" or reading with equal ardour the pedagogy of Anna Laetitia Barbauld and Elizabeth Hamilton saw More much as Wollstonecraft had seen Burke in her earlier Vindication of the Rights of Man (1790): as a writer with a "mortal antipathy to reason". Having met Hannah More and her sisters in Bath and discussed their schools and other good works, Jane Greg reported to a friend, Martha McTier in Belfast, that she found their "minds crippled in an astonishing degree". McTier was proud that in her school for poor girls her pupils "do not gabble over the testament only" and that she had those who "can read Fox and Pitt". 

More in 1820 donated money to Philander Chase, the first Episcopal Bishop of Ohio for the foundation there of Kenyon College. A portrait of More hangs in its Peirce Hall.

Last years

In Hannah More's last years, philanthropists from all parts made pilgrimages to Wrington, and after 1828 to Clifton, where she died on 7 September 1833. More left about £30,000, chiefly in legacies to charitable institutions and religious societies. The residue was to go to a new Church of St Philip and St Jacob in Bristol. She was buried beside her sisters at the Church of All Saints, Wrington, which has a bust of her in the south porch, beside one of the local son John Locke.

Legacy
Several local schools and St. Michael's Church (Reisterstown, Maryland) are named after More. Hannah More Primary School was built in Bristol Old Market in the 1840s. Her image appeared in 2012 on the Bristol Pound, a local currency. The street in Wrington where she was buried has been named Hannah More Close.

However, the Liberal politician Augustine Birrell, in his 1906 work Hannah More Once More, claimed to have buried all 19 volumes of Moore's works in his garden in disgust.

Veneration
In 2022, More was officially added to the Episcopal Church liturgical calendar with a feast day on 6 September.

Archives
Letters to, from and about Hannah More are held by Bristol Archives, including one from William Wilberforce (Ref. 28048/C/1/2) (online catalogue).
Records relating to Hannah More appear at the British Library, Manuscript Collections, Longleat, Newport Central Library, the Bodleian Library, Cambridge University: St John's College Library, the Victoria and Albert Museum, Bristol Reference Library, Cambridge University Library, The Women's Library, Gloucestershire Archives, and National Museums Liverpool: Maritime Archives and Library.

References

Sources

Resources

Primary sources
Hannah More, Works of Hannah More, 2 vols. New York: Harper, 1840

Biographies
Anna Jane Buckland, The life of Hannah More. A lady of two centuries. London: Religious Tract Society, 1882, 
Jeremy and Margaret Collingwood, Hannah More. Oxford: Lion Publishing, 1990, 
Patricia Demers, The World of Hannah More. Lexington: University Press of Kentucky, 1996, 
Charles Howard Ford, Hannah More: A Critical Biography. New York: Peter Lang, 1996, 
Marion Harland, Hannah More. New York: G. P. Putnam's Sons, 1900
Mary Alen Hopkins, Hannah More and Her Circle. London: Longmans, 1947
M. G. Jones, Hannah More Cambridge: Cambridge University Press, 1952
Helen C. Knight, Hannah More; or, Life in Hall and Cottage. New York: M. W. Dodd, 1851
Elizabeth Kowaleski-Wallace, Their Fathers' Daughters: Hannah More, Maria Edgeworth, and Patriarchal Complicity. New York: Oxford University Press, 1991
Annette Mary Budgett Meakin, Hannah More: A Biographical Study. London: John Murray, 1919
Karen Swallow Prior, Fierce Convictions: The Extraordinary Life of Hannah More—Poet, Reformer, Abolitionist. Nashville: Nelson Books, 2014, 
William Roberts, ed., Memoirs of Mrs Hannah More. New York: Harper & Bros., 1836
Anne Stott, Hannah More: The First Victorian. Oxford: Oxford University Press, 2003, 
Thomas Taylor, Memoir of Mrs. Hannah More. London: Joseph Rickerby, 1838
Henry Thompson, The Life of Hannah More With Notices of Her Sisters. London: T. Cadell, 1838
Charlotte Yonge, Hannah More. Boston: Roberts Brothers, 1888

Other sources

Jacqueline McMillan, "Hannah More: From Versificatrix to Saint", In Her Hand: Letters of Romantic-Era British Women Writers in New Zealand Collections. Otago Students of Letters. Dunedin, New Zealand: University of Otago, Department of English, 2013. pp. 23–46. Includes five letters and a poem, hitherto unpublished.
Mitzi Myers, "Hannah More's Tracts for the Times: Social Fiction and Female Ideology", Fetter'd or Free? British Women Novelists, 1670–1815. Mary Anne Schofield and Cecilia Macheski, eds. Athens: Ohio University Press, 1986

Mona Scheuerman, In Praise of Poverty: Hannah More Counters Thomas Paine and the Radical Threat. Lexington: University Press of Kentucky, 2002

Kathryn Sutherland, "Hannah More's Counter-Revolutionary Feminism", Revolution in Writing: British Literary Responses to the French Revolution. Kelvin Everest, ed. Milton Keynes: Open University Press, 1991

A Comparative Study of Three Anti-Slavery Poems Written by William Blake, Hannah More and Marcus Garvey: Black Stereotyping by Jérémie Kroubo Dagnini for GRAAT On-Line, January 2010

Archives
Papers of Hannah More are held at The Women's Library in the Library of the London School of Economics. 9/16

External links

Hannah More at the Eighteenth-Century Poetry Archive (ECPA)

Works by Hannah More at Osborne Collection of Early Children's Books (Toronto Public Library)

Hannah More from Brycchan Carey's listing of British abolitionists
The full text of Slavery, A Poem available online
The full text of The Sorrows of Yamba available online
Original 1797 edition of a printed pamphlet of The Sorrows of Yamba

1745 births
1833 deaths
English religious writers
British women essayists
English philanthropists
English Anglicans
English abolitionists
Evangelical Anglicans
Writers from Bristol
Clapham Sect
English children's writers
English dramatists and playwrights
British women dramatists and playwrights
18th-century British women writers
18th-century British writers
English women non-fiction writers
Women religious writers
Burials in Somerset
18th-century essayists
Anglican writers
Christian abolitionists
Christian humanists
British evangelicals
English evangelicals
Conservatism in the United Kingdom
Anglican saints